Sean McLaughlin may refer to:

 Sean McLaughlin (meteorologist), American television meteorologist
 Sean McLaughlin (record producer), American record producer
 Sean J. McLaughlin (born 1955), United States federal judge
 Jacksepticeye (Seán W. McLoughlin, born 1990), Irish YouTuber
 Seán McLoughlin (hurler) (born 1935), Irish hurler

See also 
 Seán McLoughlin (disambiguation)
 McLaughlin (surname)
 List of people named Sean